Granma may refer to:

A female grandparent
Granma (yacht), a yacht in which Fidel Castro and his revolutionary expedition sailed to Cuba in 1956
CF Granma a Cuban football club
Granma (baseball) or Granma Alazanes, a baseball team in the Cuban National Series
Granma (newspaper), the official newspaper of the Cuban Communist Party
Granma Province, a Cuban province
University of Granma, a university in Bayamo, Granma Province, Cuba
Granma, comic book character in Agnes

See also
Grandma (disambiguation)